Liam Higgins (1945–2006) was an Irish sportsperson.  He played Gaelic football with his local club Lispole and was a member of the Kerry senior inter-county team from 1969 until 1973.

Management

After retiring he managed Lispole, West Kerry, he managed the Kerry junior team to Munster and All Ireland Championships in 1983. He also trained Dingle CBS to Two All Ireland Championships in 1996 and 2001. During his school days he trained some of the biggest names in Gaelic football including Darragh, Tomás & Marc Ó Sé, Dara Ó Cinnéide, Tommy Griffin & Diarmuid Murphy to name just a few.

Personal life

He is a brother of former Socialist Party TD and former MEP for the Dublin constituency Joe Higgins. He taught Business Studies and Accounting in Dingle CBS.

References

1945 births
2006 deaths
Irish schoolteachers
Kerry inter-county Gaelic footballers
Lispole Gaelic footballers
Munster inter-provincial Gaelic footballers